Adrienne Leigh Jordan (born January 30, 1994) is a German- American soccer player who plays as a full-back for German Frauen-Bundesliga club 1. FFC Turbine Potsdam.

Early life 
Jordan was born in Colorado Springs, Colorado and holds dual citizenship through her German mother. She attended Rampart High Schoolwhere she lettered twice in soccer, swimming and track, while lettering once in basketball. Senior year she went to state for swimming and track, and currently holds one of the top 10 fastest times in the 100 and 300-meter hurdles. She graduated from the International Baccalaureate Diploma Program in May 2012.

University of Northern Colorado 
In 2016, Jordan graduated with a double major in Sports and Exercise Science and Foreign Language: German from the University of Northern Colorado. She played for the Northern Colorado Bears women's soccer program from 2012 to 2016. She helped lead her team to its first ever NCAA tournament appearance by winning the Big Sky Conference tournament in 2016. With a total of 72 games played during her career as a bear, Jordan made top 20 in the program and recorded 66 shots, with 30 of those on goal, 2 goals and 5 assists.
Her role in the University of Northern Colorado soccer program earned her several honors and awards, listed as follows: 
 2012 College Sports Madness Big Sky All- Conference 2nd Team
 2012 Big Sky All-Conference 1st Team
 2012 Big Sky Defensive Player of the Week
 2012 Big Sky All-Academic
 2013 Big Sky All-Conference Honorable Mention
 2014 Big Sky All-Conference 1st Team
 2014 Big Sky Co-Defensive MVP
 2014 College Sports Madness Big Sky All-Conference 2nd Team
 2014 1st Team NSCAA All-Pacific Team
 2015 Defensive Player of the Week
 2015 Big Sky All-Conference First Team
 2015 Big Sky Defensive MVP
 2015 Big Sky All-Tournament Team
 2015 NSCAA All-Pacific Second Team
 2015 Big Sky All-Academic

Club career

Colorado Pride, 2015 
In 2015 Jordan played for the W league team, Colorado Pride. Colorado Pride took second in the nation after losing to Washington Spirit Reserves in the finals.

Chicago Red Stars/ Ostersunds DFF, 2016 
Jordan was drafted by the Chicago Red Stars in the 4th round of the 2016 NWSL College Draft. In doing so she made history by being the first Northern Colorado Bears and first Big Sky player to be drafted by the NWSL. Along with this Jordan became the first Colorado Springs area player to be drafted into the NWSL.

Jordan signed with Ostersund DFF, however. She played as a left full-back as well as a left center- back for Ostersunds DFF. She started in all 19 games she was available for the Elitettan team, playing a total of 1710 minutes and earned player of the match awards twice.

ÍB Vestmannaeyja, 2017–2018 
Adrienne played in the Icelandic Úrvalsdeild (women) league for Íþróttabandalag Vestmannaeyja for the 2017 season as a right wing-back. She played in all 18 league games recording 1590 minutes played, one goal, and three assists. She also played every minute in the Women's Cup tournament to help ÍBV win the Icelandic cup.

She played a second season with ÍBV in 2018 as a right wing-back and full-back. Jordan played in all 18 league games, recording 1620 minutes played and one assist for the season. She also played in all cup games ÍBV played and earned man of the match awards four times.

Atalanta 2018–2019 
In November 2018, Jordan joined Atalanta in the Italian Serie A. Recording 15 games played throughout the 2018–2019 season playing as a full back.

Birmingham City, 2019–2020 
In August 2019, Jordan signed with English FA WSL team Birmingham City. Jordan played in 18 games during her time in Birmingham City scoring one goal in a Conti Cup game against Leicester City. This season ended early due to COVID-19.

OL Reign, 2020 
After the cancellation of the WSL, Jordan joined NWSL side OL Reign for the 2020 Challenge Cup. During the short summer tournament, she saw playing time in one game after recovering from an injury. Jordan became the first player from University of Northern Colorado to play in the NWSL  and the second from the Big Sky Conference.

UD Granadilla Tenerife, 2020 
Following her short appearance in the NWSL, Adrienne signed with Spanish side UD Granadilla for the 2020–2021 season. Jordan played in eight games for the Spanish side as a left winger or right outside defender before requesting to transfer in the Winter transfer window.

SC Sand, 2021-2022 
Jordan joined the Bundesliga side mid way though the 2020/2021 season. She played in 32 league games for SC Sand in the Frauen Bundesliga and in 3 DFB Pokal games. During her time with SC Sand, she had two assists and featured almost exclusively as a left outside defender.

International career
Jordan received a call-up to the United States U-23 team for the 2017 La Manga Series.

References

External links

Sportspeople from Colorado Springs, Colorado
1994 births
American people of German descent
American expatriate sportspeople in Spain
Living people
Chicago Red Stars draft picks
American women's soccer players
African-American women's soccer players
Women's association football defenders
Expatriate women's footballers in Sweden
Expatriate women's footballers in Iceland
American expatriate sportspeople in England
Expatriate sportspeople in Germany
Soccer players from Colorado
Adrienne Jordan
Atalanta Mozzanica Calcio Femminile Dilettantistico players
Expatriate women's footballers in Italy
Serie A (women's football) players
Birmingham City W.F.C. players
Women's Super League players
Expatriate women's footballers in England
American expatriate sportspeople in Italy
National Women's Soccer League players
OL Reign players
Northern Colorado Bears women's soccer players
UD Granadilla Tenerife players
21st-century African-American sportspeople
21st-century African-American women
American expatriate sportspeople in Sweden
Expatriate women's footballers in Spain
American expatriate women's soccer players
American expatriate sportspeople in Iceland